Curtis Earl Boozman Sr. (July 24, 1898 – April 22, 1979) was an American politician. He served as a Democratic member of the Louisiana House of Representatives.

Boozman served in the national guard at the Mexican border from 1916. In 1952, Boozman was elected to the Louisiana House of Representatives. He left office in 1956, but returned for a second term from 1960 to 1964. He was given the M. C. Gehr Blue Cap Award by the American Legion.

Boozman died in April 1979 at the Natchitoches Parish Hospital in Natchitoches Parish, Louisiana, at the age of 80.

References 

1898 births
1979 deaths
Politicians from Natchitoches, Louisiana
United States Army soldiers
American military personnel of World War I
Democratic Party members of the Louisiana House of Representatives
20th-century American politicians